Emil Hegle Svendsen (born 12 July 1985) is a retired Norwegian biathlete. He has won eight medals at Winter Olympics (four gold) and five individual gold medals and seven relay gold medals at World Championships.

He skis with Trondhjems Skiskyttere, based in Trondheim.

Career
The 2005–06 season was Svendsen's first season on the World Cup tour, before then he competed as a junior in the European Cup, now known as the IBU cup.
During his first season in the World Cup Svendsen finished fifth in three races, two of them in sprints (Brezno-Osrblie and Ruhpolding), and the other in a mass start (Holmenkollen). He also finished races in seventh, ninth, and four more within the top twenty (14th, 15th, 17th, 19th). He finished the overall season in 22nd place. He was 32nd in the pursuit, 21st in the sprint, and 7th in the mass start, only seven points behind Sven Fischer in fourth place.

Svendsen was selected for the Olympics, to compete in the mass start, in which he came sixth, after hitting 18/20 targets and finished 53.8 seconds behind winner Michael Greis of Germany.
As a junior Svendsen won four gold medals in junior World Championships, his first and second gold was in the pursuit, and the relay in Haute Maurienne in 2004, and the third and fourth gold in the individual and the sprint in Kontiolahti in 2005. He also has two bronze medals from the individual and the pursuit in Kościelisko in 2003.
During his three seasons in the European Cup, Svendsen won two races (individual and pursuit), one second place (sprint), and came third three times (all in the sprint).

For his first season in the World Cup Svendsen had an 82% shooting average, making him the 42nd best shot of the tour, but the same shooting percentage as Halvard Hanevold and Vincent Defrasne. He hit 243 out of 295 targets. He shot both 82% in his prone and standing shoot, he averaged 70% in the individual, 84% in the sprint, 81% in the pursuit, 87% in the mass start, and 76% in the relay.

On 13 December 2007, Svendsen took his first world cup victory, at the 20 km in Pokljuka. However, his big breakthrough came when he won two individual gold medals at the 2008 World Championships, winning both the individual and the mass start ahead of Ole Einar Bjørndalen. He went on winning more victories and podiums for the rest of the season, and eventually finished third overall.

The 2008/2009 season started off well for Svendsen. By placing on the podium in every of the five first races, he took the lead in the overall world cup. After the Christmas holiday however, Svendsen struggled to maintain the early season's results, and when he fell ill during the world championships and did not compete in several races, he lost the overall lead. After a couple of middle placings, he returned with a third place at the mass start event in Trondheim, and a fourth place and a victory in Khanty Mansiysk the consecutive week.

He won a silver medal in the 10 km sprint at the 2010 Winter Olympics in Vancouver on the first day of men's biathlon competition and then followed it up with two gold medals in the 20 km individual and the relay event.

He won 2 gold medals in 2014 Winter Olympics: in mass-start and mixed relay (together with Ole Einar Bjørndalen, Tiril Eckhoff and Tora Berger).

On 9 April 2018, he announced his retirement from biathlon following the 2017–2018 season.

Personal life
He has been in a relationship with Samantha Skogrand since November 2013. In January 2019 the couple became parents to a son whom they named Magnus and in July 2021 they welcomed their second child - daughter Elsa. The family resides in Oslo.

Biathlon results
All results are sourced from the International Biathlon Union.

Olympic Games
8 medals (4 gold, 3 silver, 1 bronze)

*The mixed relay was added as an event in 2014.

World Championships
21 medals (12 gold, 6 silver, 3 bronze)

*During Olympic seasons competitions are only held for those events not included in the Olympic program.

Junior/Youth World Championships

World Cup

Individual victories
38 victories (8 In, 11 Sp, 12 Pu, 7 MS) 
 
*Results are from UIPMB and IBU races which include the Biathlon World Cup, Biathlon World Championships and the Winter Olympic Games.

See also
List of multiple Olympic gold medalists

References

External links
 
 
 
 
 

1985 births
Living people
Sportspeople from Trondheim
Norwegian male biathletes
Biathletes at the 2006 Winter Olympics
Biathletes at the 2010 Winter Olympics
Biathletes at the 2014 Winter Olympics
Biathletes at the 2018 Winter Olympics
Olympic biathletes of Norway
Medalists at the 2010 Winter Olympics
Medalists at the 2014 Winter Olympics
Medalists at the 2018 Winter Olympics
Olympic medalists in biathlon
Olympic gold medalists for Norway
Olympic silver medalists for Norway
Olympic bronze medalists for Norway
Biathlon World Championships medalists
Holmenkollen Ski Festival winners
Holmenkollen medalists